Lorenzo Mariani is a stage director of opera in Italy, the United States, Israel, Finland, and across the world. From 2005 to 2012 Mariani has been artistic director of the Teatro Massimo in Palermo. The Teatro Massimo is the largest theatre in Italy.

Early life
Mariani was born in New York City, where he was surrounded by opera music and performers throughout his childhood.

In 1924, his father Adolph Mariani opened the Astirestaurant. Over the next 75 years it became a Greenwich Village landmark because, every night, the restaurant resounded with the sounds of Italian opera and song. The waiters would  break into spontaneous arias, and many of the customers were stars of the theater and opera world. Some rising opera stars, such as tenor Rinaldo Toglia, would sing full-time at the restaurant without having to wait tables.

The walls of Asticontained autographed photos of Babe Ruth, Noël Coward and Arturo Toscanini, as well as a chorus full of great opera singers - Luciano Pavarotti, Mario Lanza, Joan Sutherland and Jussi Bjöerling. There were even four theater seats from the old Metropolitan Opera House.

All of this opera tradition surrounded Lorenzo Mariani, even before he graduated from The Taft School in 1973 and from Harvard College in 1977.

Harvard
Mariani demonstrated several talents before and during his Harvard years. While still at Taft, he performed a striking piano recital of George Gershwin's Rhapsody in Blue. 
As an undergraduate, he was recognized for his theatrical performance in Nathanael West's Miss Lonelyhearts. He also directed the Loeb Mainstage production of George Bernard Shaw's Candida.
 
Together with Sarah McClusky and several other undergraduates, Mariani spent a summer running an experimental theater at Harvard's Loeb Drama Center. A first for the Loeb, the "Loeb Ex" was run like an off-Broadway theater. Mariani, McClusky and the students did all of the technical and business work, from building sets to collecting tickets. The Loeb Ex was not merely "successful." It showed the viability of a year-round theatrical institution at Harvard, and laid the foundation for what ultimately became the Harvard American Repertory Theatre.

While still at Harvard, Mariani published film reviews in the Harvard Crimson, and articles about Italian politics.
He was also known for his love and knowledge of opera, and published incisive analyses of singers such as José Carreras, Giacomo Lauri-Volpi, Plácido Domingo, Enrico Caruso, Fancesco Tamagno, Fischer-Dieskau, and Luciano Pavarotti.

International opera work

After graduating from Harvard, Mariani made his opera staging debut with Bartók's Bluebeard's Castle at the Teatro Comunale in Florence. Since then, he developed a frequent and recurring collaboration with the Maggio Musicale Fiorentino Festival.

Mariani later directed Andrea Bocelli's operatic debut in La Bohème.

He also directed operas at some of the world's most prestigious opera houses and festivals, including the Israeli Opera in Tel Aviv, Teatro Comunale di Bologna, Teatro Regio di Torino, the Wexford Festival, the Finnish National Opera, the San Francisco Opera, and Chicago's Lyric Opera.

Mariani has worked with many prominent conductors, including Zubin Mehta, Myung-Whun Chung, Claudio Abbado, John Eliot Gardiner, and Daniele Gatti.

Since 2005, Mariani has been artistic director of the Teatro Massimo ("The Greatest Theatre"), located on the Piazza Verdi in Palermo. Teatro Massimo is the largest theatre in Italy, and the third largest opera house in Europe. It seats nearly 1,400 with seven tiers of boxes rising up around an inclined stage, and shaped in the traditional horseshoe style.

Recent productions
Mariani's recent productions include Lucio Dalla's musical Tosca Amore Disperato, The Rake's Progress and The Threepenny Opera for Rome's Accademia di Santa Cecilia; Candide for Teatro San Carlo of Naples; Cavalleria Rusticana and Pagliacci for the Teatro Massimo of Palermo, Teatro Lirico of Cagliari and Savonlinna Opera Festival in Finland; and La Fanciulla del West for the San Francisco Opera.

Written by Giacomo Puccini, La Fanciulla del West was the first collaboration between the San Francisco Opera and the Teatro Massimo. Mariani directed both productions, which received great critical acclaim.

References

External links

 Teatro Massimo official website, where one can virtually visit the theater

Living people
Taft School alumni
Harvard College alumni
American opera directors
American people of Italian descent
Year of birth missing (living people)